Altrincham was a county constituency of the House of Commons of the Parliament of the United Kingdom from 1885 to 1945. It elected one Member of Parliament (MP) by the first past the post system of election.

History and boundaries 

Altrincham was created under the Redistribution of Seats Act 1885 from the much larger two-member constituencies of Mid Cheshire and East Cheshire, as one of eight new single-member divisions of the county of Cheshire.

Under the Representation of the People Act 1918, it was redefined to cover the urban districts of Altrincham, Ashton upon Mersey, Bowdon, Cheadle and Gatley, Hale, Handforth, Lymm and Sale, and part of the rural district of Bucklow, all in Cheshire. The boundaries were broadly similar, with Bramhall (then part of Hazel Grove and Bramhall UD) being transferred to Knutsford.

Subsequent reorganisations of local authority areas resulted in Ashton upon Mersey being absorbed into Sale, which later became a municipal borough; Altrincham being expanded to include the parish of Timperley, also becoming a municipal borough; and Handforth being absorbed into the urban district of Wilmslow.

The House of Commons (Redistribution of Seats) Act 1944 set up Boundary Commissions to carry out periodic reviews of the distribution of parliamentary constituencies. It also authorised an initial review to subdivide abnormally large constituencies (those exceeding an electorate of 100,000) in time for the 1945 election. This was implemented by the Redistribution of Seats Order 1945 under which Cheshire was allocated one additional seat, by splitting the Altrincham Division into two seats:

 Altrincham and Sale Parliamentary Borough, comprising the two respective municipal boroughs; and
 Bucklow County Division, comprising the urban districts of Bowdon, Cheadle and Gatley, Hale and Lymm and the part of the rural district of Bucklow. It also included the former parishes of Baguley, Northenden and Northen Etchells which had been absorbed into the county borough of Manchester.

The part comprising the former urban district of Handforth was transferred to Knutsford.

Members of Parliament 
 Constituency created (1885)

Election results

Elections in the 1880s

Brooks' death caused a by-election.

Elections in the 1890s

Elections in the 1900s

Elections in the 1910s 

General Election 1914–15:

Another General Election was required to take place before the end of 1915. The political parties had been making preparations for an election to take place and by the July 1914, the following candidates had been selected; 
Unionist: Collingwood George Clements Hamilton
Liberal: Edward Powell

Elections in the 1920s

Elections in the 1930s 

 Percentage change and swing are calculated from 1929.

Elections in the 1940s 
A General Election was due to take place before the end of 1940, but was postponed due to the Second World War. By 1939, the following candidates had been selected to contest this constituency;
 Conservative: Edward Grigg
 Labour: C F C Donnelly

References

See also 
 History of parliamentary constituencies and boundaries in Cheshire
1913 Altrincham by-election
 1933 Altrincham by-election

Parliamentary constituencies in Cheshire (historic)
Constituencies of the Parliament of the United Kingdom established in 1885
Constituencies of the Parliament of the United Kingdom disestablished in 1945
Altrincham
Politics of Trafford